Begonia megaptera, the large winged begonia, is a species of flowering plant in the family Begoniaceae, native to Nepal, the eastern Himalaya, Assam, Bangladesh, and Myanmar. Very rare in its native habitat, it is cultivated as an ornamental and medicinal plant.

References

megaptera
Flora of Nepal
Flora of East Himalaya
Flora of Assam (region)
Flora of Bangladesh
Flora of Myanmar
Plants described in 1859